The National Airborne Service Corps (NASC) is the sole agency of the Republic of China (Taiwan) that operates aircraft and helicopters besides military and paramilitary units. The agency is responsible for executing and providing aerial support for search and rescue, disaster relief, emergency medical service, transportation, monitoring, reconnaissance and patrol.

History
In July 2000, four workers employed by the government was stranded on a shoal of the Bazhang River when they are performing riverbed maintenance construction project and the flood strikes. Due to the bureaucracy of different authorities passing the buck, the workers were stranded for 3 hours and eventually overwhelmed by the flood. While the search and rescue personnel already arrived, they had no helicopter to fly, so they could do nothing but standing on the riverbanks, watching them drowning, and the whole situation was aired live on multiple news channels in Taiwan. The incident is known as the Bazhang River Incident. Due to the incompetence of bureaucracy, a unified authority was called to form. 

Hence, NASC was formed with the merging of four distinct agencies, namely the Airborne Squadron of National Police Agency, the Preparatory Office of the Airborne Fire Fighting Squadron of National Fire Agency, the Aviation Team of Civil Aeronautics Administration of Ministry of Transportation and Communications, and the Air Patrol Squadron of the Coast Guard Administration on 10 March 2004.

In April 2020 a NASC AS-365 Dauphin helicopter crashed during a training exercise at Kaohsiung International Airport. All five crew members walked away from the crash.

In July 2020 the Taiwanese President announced a major pay raise for NASC pilots and smaller pay raises for NASC support staff in recognition of their dangerous profession and the benefit they bring to Taiwanese in need. According to the President NASC had rescued more than 7,100 people since its founding in 2004. Their contribution to wildfire fighting was also acknowledged.

The NASC saw three times the rescue callouts in 2020 as 2019 due to increased domestic travel and hiking in mountain areas due to limits on international travel caused by the COVID-19 epidemic. An increase in the amount of land accessible to recreational hikers which coincided with the boom in hiking contributed to the high level of callouts. Given the high cost of rescue the NASC has begun to seek compensation from those with means who have to be rescued while hiking outside of legal hiking areas.

Organizational structure
 Aviation Affairs Division
 Maintenance Division
 Duty Command Center
 Secretariat
 Personnel Office
 Accounting Office
 Civil Service Ethics Office
 Service Brigade

Fleet
Between 2009-01-01 and 2019-12-31 the fleet racked up 75,746 flight hours over 56,366 sorties and effected 3,891 rescues.

Fleet stations

North
 Taipei Songshan Airport (First Brigade)
 Hualien Airport (First Brigade)

Middle
 Taichung Airport (Second Brigade)

South
 Tainan Airport (Third Brigade)
 Kaohsiung International Airport (Third Brigade)
 Taitung Airport (Third Brigade)

Transportation
NASC headquarters office is accessible within walking distance North of Dapinglin MRT station of the Taipei Metro.

See also
 Ministry of the Interior (Taiwan)
 Search and rescue

References

2004 establishments in Taiwan
Executive Yuan
Rescue aviation
Air ambulance services in Taiwan
Police aviation
Aerial firefighting